Sándor Tihanyi (born 28 April 1963) is a Hungarian motorcycle speedway rider.

Career
Tihanyi was a member of Hungary's national team during the 1980s and 1990s.

Tihanyi qualified for the 1988 World Final in Vojens, Denmark where he finished 15th with three points. He was also a reserve for the 1990 World Final at the Odsal Stadium in Bradford, England but did not ride in the final.

His greatest achievement was in 1990, when he teamed up with Zoltán Adorján to secure a first medal at world level for Hungary when they won a bronze at the 1990 Speedway World Pairs Championship in Germany.

World Final Appearances

Individual World Championship
 1988 -  Vojens, Speedway Center - 15th - 3pts
 1990 -  Bradford, Odsal Stadium - Reserve - did not ride

World Pairs Championship
 1990 -  Landshut, Ellermühle Stadium (with Zoltán Adorján) - 3rd - 37pts

See also
 Hungary national speedway team

References

1963 births
Living people
Hungarian speedway riders